The 1960 Northeast Louisiana State Indians football team was an American football team that represented Northeast Louisiana State College (now known as the University of Louisiana at Monroe) in the Gulf States Conference during the 1960 NCAA College Division football season. In their third year under head coach Jack C. Rowan, the team compiled a 3–7 record.

Schedule

References

Northeast Louisiana
Louisiana–Monroe Warhawks football seasons
Northeast Louisiana State Indians football